In music, Op. 151 stands for Opus number 151. Compositions that are assigned this number include:

 Diabelli – Sonatinas
 Ries – Piano Concerto No. 8
 Tveitt – A Hundred Hardanger Tunes